The Planets: A Modern Allegory is a radio play, written in verse, by Alfred Kreymborg.  The first performance was on 6 June 1938 by the National Broadcasting Company at the Hayden Planetarium in New York City, and was directed by Thomas L. Riley.  The play was originally set to the music of The Planets Suite by Gustav Holst; for the first performance the NBC Symphony Orchestra was conducted by H. Leopold Spitalny. The first broadcast was so enthusiastically received that it was repeated a few weeks later.

The play describes the early history of the twentieth century, including the onset of World War I, and the 'hysterical' 1920s, ending with a mix of dread and uncertainty about the future.  The book of the play is dedicated 'to peace'; it was published by Farrar & Rinehart, New York, in 1938.  The central figure of the play is the Astrologer, who encounters the various planets in turn, as the events of world history are alluded to in a somewhat prophetic tone.

Cast of the first performance

References
Kreymborg, Alfred: The Planets: A Modern Allegory, Farrar & Rinehart, New York, 1938.

External links
1938 in Broadcasting

1938 books
American radio dramas
Farrar & Rinehart books